The Old Oregon Trail is a 1928 American silent film directed by Denver Dixon, starring F. C. Rose and Delores Booth.

Cast
 F. C. Rose as Thomas Mercer
 Delores Booth as Billie Mercer
 Art Seales as The squatter
 Grace Underwood as The mother
 Sid Seales as The teamster
 Art Mix as The Cowboy from Pasco [aka Calamity Joe]

References

1928 films
American silent films
American black-and-white films
Squatting in film
Films directed by Victor Adamson